This is a partial list of notable female calligraphers.

3rd century
 Xie Daoyun Chinese poet, writer, scholar and calligrapher 
 Wei Shuo (272–349) Chinese calligrapher

7th-10th centuries
 Al-Shifa' bint Abdullah  Arabic calligrapher
 Al-Nuddar (d. 984) Andalusian calligrapher and scholar
 Umm al-Darda al-Sughra 
 Sana (8th Century) Abbasid calligrapher 
 Fadl (d. 260/873-74) Abbasid poet and calligrapher
 Gulsum al-Attabi (d. 220/835) Arabic calligrapher
 Fadl (10th Century)
 Duhtar-i ibn Mukla Shirazi (10th Century)
 Muzna (d. 358/969)
 Fadl (d. 260/873-74)
 Fatima (?-?) Andalusian calligrapher

11th-12th centuries
  Safiyyah bint Abd al-Rabb (d. 1026)
 Fatima bint Zakariya bint Abdullah al-Shebbarp (d. 1036)
 Diemoth (b. 1060-130) Bavarian calligrapher
 Fatima al-Baghdadi bint Hasan b. ‘Alī b. ‘Abdullah Attar (d. 480/1087) Iraqi calligrapher
 Fakhr-un-Nisa (d. 1112) Iranian calligrapher
 Lubna (d. 1003)  Abbasid poet and calligrapher 
 Zaynab Shahda bint Ahmad b. Al-Faraj b. ‘Omar Al-Abrī (d. 547/1178) Iraqi calligrapher  
 Sittu'r-Rida bint Nasrallah b. Mas'ud (d. after 567/1171)

13th-14th centuries
 Shuhda Bint Al-‘Ibari (d. 1178) Abbasid calligrapher 
 Guan Daosheng (1262–1319) Chinese poet, painter and calligrapher 
 Cao Miaoqing Chinese poet and calligrapher
 Sitt Nasim Abbasid calligrapher

15th-16th centuries
 Clara Hätzlerin (c. 1430–1476) Bavarian scribe
 Jacomina Hondius (1558–1628) Flemish and Dutch calligrapher 
 Esther Inglis (1571–1624) English miniaturist and calligrapher
 Margareta Karthäuserin (b. ?) Bavarian scribe
 Elizabeth Lucar (1510–1537) British calligrapher
 Marie Pavie (fl. 1600) French calligrapher
 Fatimah bint Quraymazan (d. 1558)
 Shin Saimdang (1504–1551) Korean artist, author and calligrapher
 Maria Strick (1577-1625) Dutch calligrapher and teacher

17th-18th centuries
 Amina (daughter of calligrapher, Mustafa Chelebi) minor calligrapher active in Ottoman Bosnia 
 Goharshad Ghazvini Persian calligrapher
 Ike Gyokuran (1727–1784)  Japanese painter and calligrapher
 Esmâ Ibret Hanim (b. 1780) Ottoman calligrapher 
 Marjan al-Katib al-Islami Iranian calligrapher
 Fatıma Ânî Hanım (d.1122 / 1710) Ottoman calligrapher
 Fatıma Tûtî (d. 1106-1123 / 1694-95)
 Fang Weiyi (1585–1668) Chinese poet, calligrapher and historian
 Şerife Zehra Hanim Ottoman calligrapher
 Im Yunjidang (1721–1793) Korean philosopher and calligrapher
 Cao Zhenxiu (b. 1762) Chinese calligrapher

19th-20th centuries
 Wijdan Ali (b. 1939) Iraqi calligrapher
 Ameena Ahmad Ahuja Indian painter and calligrapher
 Leslie Charlotte Benenson (1941–2018) English artist and calligrapher
 Mickie Caspi (b. 1961) Israeli calligrapher and artist
 Wasma'a Khalid Chorbachi (b. 1944) American-Iraqi artist and calligrapher
 Chang Ch'ung-ho (1914–2015) Chinese poet and calligrapher
 Winnie Siu Davies (b. ?) Chinese painter and calligrapher
 Elizabeth Friedländer (1903–1984) German calligrapher 
 Jen Taylor Friedman (b. ?) ritual scribe
 Wang Huiqin (b. 1945) Chinese-Slovenian calligrapher
 Hu Jieqing (1905–2001) Chinese painter and calligrapher
 Pouran Jinchi (b. 1959) Iranian-American artist and calligrapher
 Samira Kitman (b. 1984) Afghani-British calligrapher and artist
 Hildegard Korger (b. 1935) German calligrapher
 Monika Krajewska (b. ?) Polish calligrapher and mizrah artist
 Patricia Lovett (b.?) British scribe, calligrapher and illuminator
 Ada Louise Powell (b. 1865) British decorative artist and calligrapher
 Zahide Selma Hanim (1857–1895) Ottoman calligrapher 
 Hilal Kazan - Turkish academic, historian and calligrapher 
 Midori Kono Thiel (b. ?) Japanese-American calligrapher
 Huda Totonji (b.?) Arab-American calligrapher
 Carol Twombly (b. 1959) American calligrapher
 Şerife Fatma "Mevhibe" Hanım Ottoman calligrapher
 Ema Saikō (1787–1861) Japanese calligrapher
 Zulaykhah Khatimi al-Sa'di (?-?) 
 Emine Servet Hanim (b. 1859) Ottoman calligrapher 
 Soraya Syed (b. 1976) English-Pakistani calligrapher
 Gudrun Zapf von Hesse (1918–2019) German typographer, calligrapher and book-binder
 Sheila Waters (1929—2022) English calligrapher
 Irene Wellington (1904–1984) British calligrapher
 Mary White (ceramicist and calligrapher) (1926–2013) British calligrapher
 Hilda Wiseman (1894–1982) Australian calligrapher, artist and designer
 Rachel Yallop (b. ?) British calligrapher
 Yuan Xiaoyuan (1901–2003) Chinese diplomat, politician, author, linguist, calligrapher and artist 
 Lou Zhenggang (b. 1966) Chinese artist and calligrapher
 Nuria Garcia Masip (b. 1978) Spanish Calligrapher

See also
 Calligraphy
 Islamic calligraphy

References

Further reading

 Salah al-Din al-Munajjid, "Women's Roles in the Art of Arabic Calligraphy" in: George Nicholas Atiyeh (ed.), The Book in the Islamic World: The Written Word and Communication in the Middle East, Albany, State University of New York Press, 1995, pp 141–149.

Women calligraphers
Lists of women by occupation